Margarita Eustaquia Maza Parada (March 29, 1826 – January 2, 1871), later known as Margarita Maza de Juárez, was the wife of Benito Juárez and First Lady of Mexico from 1858 to 1864. She held that position again from 1867 until her death from cancer in 1871, after her husband returned to power following the fall of Emperor Maximilian.

Biography

Margarita Eustaquia Maza Parada was born in Oaxaca, Oaxaca in 1826. She was adopted by the Genovese agriculturist Antonio Maza and his Mexican wife Petra Parada Sigüenza. They were a successful, socially prominent family in the city, and she received a refined education.

As was common in those years, her family had hired young Zapotecs to work in the household as domestic servants. They tended to come from small, rural villages. Years before Margarita's birth, Josefa Juárez García had worked for some time as a maid and cook in the upper-class Maza-Parada household. She and her siblings were orphaned after the deaths of their parents and grandparents. Benito Juárez, one of her younger brothers, left their home town of San Pablo Guelatao in 1818 and came to the city of Oaxaca at the age of 12, to work and get an education. Josefa helped him get a position with the Maza family, and he developed a close relationship with them. Today the former Maza family house is known as Casa de Juarez and operated as a museum in his honor.

Aided by a lay Franciscan who recognized his intelligence and desire for learning, Juárez entered a seminary. Not feeling called to the priesthood, he decided to study law in college, where he also began to be politically active. He was elected to the city council of Oaxaca. He got his law degree, practiced several years as a lawyer to get established, and in 1841 was appointed as a judge. He had entered the educated professional class in the city.

Marriage and family
During these years, Margarita Maza was being educated and approaching womanhood. She accepted Juárez's proposal and was married to him on October 31, 1843 in the church of San Felipe Neri in Oaxaca city (the church is named after the patron saint of Rome, Italy). Juárez was 37, and Margarita was 17. They had 12 children together, seven of whom lived to adulthood: one boy and six girls.(Note: Another source says they had eleven children, three boys and eight girls, of whom two boys and a girl died young.) 

In addition, they adopted Susana Chagoya, Juárez's daughter from a relationship before his marriage. Her mother died when the girl was three. Margarita knew that Juárez also had an older son, Tereso, from that relationship, whom she got to know later.

Their ethnically mixed marriage was unusual at the time, but this is not often noted in standard biographies. Historian Enrique Krauze notes: "In this uncommon instance, a white woman had been conquered by an Indian, not a native woman by a Spaniard."

Family life and First Lady
Margarita Maza de Juárez built their family life as her husband advanced in politics. She managed a full household, including servants to assist her increasingly large family. As an educated woman, she is believed to have supported her husband in his work and to have taken an active role in discussing politics. Such actions were not well recognized for decades.  

He was appointed to the chief justice position on the Supreme Court, putting him in the line of succession in 1858 after the Conservatives forced out the president.  Juárez succeeded to the presidency in 1858 from his position as chief judge on the Supreme Court, according to the Constitution. The Conservatives had forced out the previous president, and for a time two governments ran in competition. He represented the Liberal Party. He was later elected to the office in his own right.

During the French Intervention in Mexico, beginning in 1863 Juárez was leading the resistance against the French and the Second Mexican Empire they installed under Maximilian. Margarita Maza de Juárez at first was with him in the north, then had to leave the country to protect their children. She lived with her family for a time in New York City, and then in Washington, DC, where they lived in exile for a few years. Two of their young sons died, in 1864 and 1865. 

Maza de Juárez took on a diplomatic role, meeting with top-ranking Americans, including U.S. President Abraham Lincoln, who received her as the First Lady of Mexico. The US recognized Benito Juárez as representing the only legitimate government of Mexico. 

In addition to that diplomatic role, Maza de Juárez and her daughters worked with other Liberal Mexican women to organize in support of the government in exile. They raised funds for the troops, to supply hospitals, and to care for civilian victims of the war.

After Maximilian I was deposed, in 1867 Margarita Maza de Juárez returned to Mexico with her family. Her husband resumed the presidency, and was re-elected to office in his own right, serving until his death in 1872. He survived his wife's death from cancer by a year. The couple were buried in the Juárez mausoleum in Mexico City.

Their surviving son Benito Luis Narciso Juárez Maza (b. 29 October 1852) was a disappointment. He did not do well at business or politics. Although he was appointed as governor of Oaxaca, his biographers concur that he was not a good administrator. He married María Klerian, a French woman, but they had no surviving children.

Descendants of Juárez-Maza were born through the daughters' families, and the paternal surname was lost.

References

Further reading
Mendieta Alatorre, Angeles. Margarita Maza de Juárez: Antología, iconografía y efemérides. Mexico City 1972.
Velasco Pérez, Carlos. Margarita Maza de Juárez: Primera dama de la nación. Oaxaca, 1986.

1826 births
1871 deaths
First ladies of Mexico
People from Oaxaca
Mexican people of Italian descent